The following is the list of Award winners for the Karnataka State Best Film First award.

See also
Karnataka State Film Awards

References

Film festivals in India